The 2018–19 season was the club's sixth season in the Scottish Premiership and their tenth consecutive season in the top flight of Scottish football. St Johnstone also competed in the Scottish Cup and the League Cup, where they were knocked out of both by Celtic.

Season Summary

Tommy Wright remained as manager for the season. After getting through the Group stages of the League Cup (and losing to Kilmarnock in the first match of the season), Saints had a 4 match unbeaten run, although by the end of September they went on a 4 match win less run, which included being knocked out of the League Cup by Celtic. They were then unbeaten in the League through much of October, November and into December. They ended the year with a couple of home defeats and a couple of away wins. After losing to Hearts in league at the end of January however, the Saints went on an 8 match win less run, which included being knocked out of the Scottish Cup, again by Celtic. The win less run came to an end in a rearranged match at home to St. Mirren. They ended the regular season in seventh, therefore in the bottom six for the post-split for the second season in a row. Tony Watt announced he rejected a deal and would be leaving the club at the end of the season. The Saints finished the League season in Seventh place, claiming the best of the bottom six.

Results & fixtures

Pre-season

Scottish Premiership

League Cup

Scottish Cup

Squad statistics

Appearances

|-
|colspan="17"|Player who left the club during the season
|-

|}

Team statistics

League table

Group B Table

Transfers

Players in

Players out

See also
List of St Johnstone F.C. seasons

Footnotes

References

St Johnstone F.C. seasons
St Johnstone